The 2013 NACAC Cross Country Championships took place on January 26, 2013.  The races were held at the Manchester Golf Club in Mandeville, Jamaica.  A detailed report of the event was given.

Complete results were published.

Medallists

Medal table (unofficial)

Note: Totals include both individual and team medals, with medals in the team competition counting as one medal.

Participation
According to an unofficial count, 114 athletes from 8 countries participated.

 (3)
 (10)
 (23)
 (22)
 México (8)
 (17)
 (11)
 (20)

See also
 2013 in athletics (track and field)

References

NACAC Cross Country Championships
NACAC Cross Country Championships
NACAC Cross Country Championships
NACAC Cross Country Championships
Cross country running in Jamaica